Louis Rosier (5 November 1905 in Chapdes-Beaufort – 29 October 1956 in Neuilly-sur-Seine) was a racing driver from France.

Career highlights
He participated in 38 Formula One World Championship Grands Prix, debuting on 13 May 1950.  He achieved 2 podiums, and scored a total of 18 championship points. He won the Dutch Grand Prix twice in consecutive years between 1950 and 1951, the Circuit d'Albi, Grand-Prix de l'Albigeois and the 24 Hours of Le Mans with his son Jean-Louis Rosier. Rosier owned the Renault dealership of Clermont-Ferrand.

In 2016, in an academic paper that reported a mathematical modeling study that assessed the relative influence of driver and machine, Rosier was ranked the 19th best Formula One driver of all time.

Formula One and sports car competition

Rosier finished 4th at Silverstone in a Talbot, in October 1948. The event was the RAC International Grand Prix, the first grand prix to be held in England since 1927. He drove a 4.5-liter, unsupercharged Talbot-Lago to 3rd place at the 1949 British Grand Prix at Silverstone.
Rosier won an International Grand Prix at Spa-Francorchamps in June 1949. He assumed the lead after 23 laps, coming across the finish line ahead of Luigi Villoresi.
Rosier won the 1950 24 Hours of Le Mans in a blue Talbot. He teamed up with his son Jean-Louis Rosier who only drove two laps during the race, which means Louis won the race practically by himself. He finished one lap ahead of Pierre Meyrat who drove a car of the same marque. The Rosiers covered 256 laps, in 23:54:2.2. Rosier captured the Grand Prix d'Albi in Albi, France in May 1953. He drove a Ferrari, covering the 18 laps of the finals, in 56:36:8. He averaged . Rosier placed second in a Ferrari at
a Grand Prix in Aix-Les-Bains, in July 1953. His time was 2:24:48.1. In April 1956 Rosier finished 4th in a Maserati, in a 201-mile race at Aintree. Rosier finished 5th at the 1956 German Grand Prix behind the wheel of a Maserati.

Écurie Rosier 

Louis Rosier was the owner and manager of a racing team, the "Ecurie Rosier". Originally set up to run Rosier's Talbot-Lago T26 (for either Rosier or a guest driver), and later evolved to an actual team running 250Fs and finally Ferrari 500s simultaneously for Rosier and another driver. Throughout the 1950s, Écurie Rosier provided drives in Formula One for Henri Louveau, Georges Grignard, Louis Chiron, Maurice Trintignant, André Simon and Robert Manzon.

Circuit Louis Rosier 
Louis Rosier was one of the key sponsors of the Charade race track. After World War II, Jean Auchatraire (president of the racing section of the local Automobile Club) and Louis Rosier promoted the idea of a race track around Clermont-Ferrand.

A set of preliminary designs were drawn up for a circuit of a length between 4 and 6 km, meeting the latest safety regulations with large parking capacity at a location just outside the city limits on a hilly landscape.

The Le Mans disaster (death toll: 84 lives) on 11 June 1955 brought the project to a halt.  All race events were postponed. No further events were allowed to take place on temporary urban tracks. Racing events were only to be allowed on dedicated race-tracks, providing that they met a new set of rules. In Clermont-Ferrand, as was the case for many other new race tracks, new safety devices were being imagined and discussed, reviewed and assessed.  But the concept of a "mountain race track" moved forward. It would be the only one of its kind in France.

Auchatraire, Rosier and Raymond Roche (the manager of Reims-Gueux race track) worked together to get the project accepted by the political community before searching for funding. But Rosier was killed at Montlhéry on 26 October 1956 and would not witness his project come to fruition. The racetrack was opened on 27 July 1958, with the name of its famous founder "Circuit de Charade Louis Rosier".  Soon after, several champions participated in racing events on the track, each of them, including Stirling Moss, making very positive statements about the track and its surrounding.

Car manufacturer

Rosier's Renault dealership in Clermont-Ferrand was one of the largest Renault dealerships in France. Rosier's dealership also sold other industrial and farming equipment. The building housing this important business has been destroyed.

In 1951, Louis Rosier designed a prototype based on the 4CV Renault.

In 1953, using the concept of a barchetta that he raced at Le Mans, Rosier, together with Italian coachbuilder Rocco Motto, designed a cabriolet, still using 4CV Renault sub assemblies. This model was built in a quantity of about 200 units by Brissonneau. It was even introduced at a car show in New York.

Some time later he designed a roadster using Renault Frégate elements with an aluminum body developed by Rocco Motto, on a multi-tubular frame. The engine was seriously revised, the body was lightened, the results was an interesting 950 kg for 80 hp.

Death
On 7 October 1956 Louis Rosier was competing in the Coupe du Salon sports car race at Montlhéry in a Ferrari 750 Monza. During the race he crashed, sustaining head injuries. Three weeks later, on 29 October 1956, Rosier succumbed to the injuries received in the crash.

Racing record

Post WWII Grandes Épreuves results
(key)

Complete Formula One World Championship results
(key) (Races in bold indicate pole position; Races in italics indicate fastest lap)

Notes
 – Shared drive with Charles Pozzi

Complete Formula One non-championship results
(key) (Races in bold indicate pole position; Races in italics indicate fastest lap)

Complete 24 Hours of Le Mans results

References

1905 births
1956 deaths
French racing drivers
French Formula One drivers
Ecurie Rosier Formula One drivers
Maserati Formula One drivers
Talbot Formula One drivers
Grand Prix drivers
Racing drivers who died while racing
Sport deaths in France
24 Hours of Le Mans drivers
24 Hours of Le Mans winning drivers
World Sportscar Championship drivers
Formula One team owners
Carrera Panamericana drivers